Brumus is a genus of beetle of the family Coccinellidae.

Species
 Brumus bella  Wollaston 
 Brumus cedri  (J. Sahlberg, 1913) 
 Brumus ceylonicus  Weise, 1900 
 Brumus fulviventris  Fairmare 
 Brumus mongolicus  Fleischer, 1900 
 Brumus nigrifrons  Gerst 
 Brumus oblongus  (Weidenbach, 1859) 
 Brumus octosignatus  (Gebler, 1830)  
 Brumus quadriplagiatus  Wollaston, 1864
Brumus quadripustulatus (Linnaeus, 1758)

External links
 Brumus at BioLib

Coccinellidae genera
Taxa named by Étienne Mulsant